The Pontiac Solstice is a sports car that was produced by Pontiac. Introduced at the 2004 North American International Auto Show, the Solstice roadster began production in Wilmington, Delaware, starting in mid-2005 for the 2006 model year. The exterior styling of the production Solstice is similar to that of the 2002 Solstice concept that preceded it. Production of the Solstice was to be running before summer 2005, but delays at the Wilmington plant pushed volume production to the fourth quarter. The new hardtop targa top 2009 model was announced in mid-2008. The Solstice uses the GM Kappa platform, which also underpins the Saturn Sky, Opel GT, and Daewoo G2X. It was the brand's first two-seater since the Pontiac Fiero was discontinued in 1988. The Solstice was nominated for the North American Car of the Year award and Design of the Year award from the Automobile Journalists Association of Canada (AJAC) for 2006. It was a runaway hit for Pontiac, with 7,000 orders in the first 10 days of availability and 6,000 more orders before winter. Although first-year production was planned at 7,000, GM apologized to customers for delays and increased production, delivering 10,000 by March 1.

Following the 2008 economic recession, GM discontinued the Pontiac division. Production ended with the closure of the Wilmington Assembly plant in July 2009.

GXP (2007–2009)

The GXP version of the Solstice debuted at the Los Angeles Auto Show in January 2006. It is powered by a new 2.0 Liter (121.9 cu in) I4 Ecotec engine equipped with a dual-scroll turbocharger. This is the highest specific output of any engine by cubic inches in the history of General Motors at 2.1 hp (1.6 kW) per cubic inch, and it is the first gasoline direct injection engine from an American automaker.

Other GXP features include standard Stabilitrak traction control, a limited-slip differential, and anti-lock brakes. Summer tires on 18-inch wheels are standard.

Solstice Coupe (2009-2010)

A targa coupe version of the Solstice was unveiled at the 2008 New York Auto Show. Engine choices are the same as the convertible versions. The roof can be removed, but the hard roof cannot be fitted into the trunk. An optional cloth top is available, which can be fitted into the trunk.

The car went on sale in early 2009. The Pontiac Solstice Coupes are considered to be quite rare: There were a total of 1,266 Solstice Coupes that were able to be manufactured before the production line in Wilmington, Delaware was shut down: 102 pre-production 2009 models, 1,152 sequentially vin'd regular production 2009 models, and 12 pre-production 2010 models. This is in contrast to over 64,000 of the Pontiac Solstice Convertibles that were manufactured.

Summary of all 1,266 Pontiac Solstice Coupes Built:

 1 Unit - “Santiago” Teal Metallic (Specific to Canadian Market - Color new for 2010)
 26 Units - “Fresh” Hydro Blue - Paint Code 22U (USA 25 inc. 1 Heritage Ed. /CAN 1/MEX 0) 2%
 37 Units - “Mean” Yellow - Paint Code 34U (USA 29/CAN 4/MEX 4) 3%
 39 Units - “Deep” Blue - Paint Code 48U (USA 35/CAN 1/MEX 3) 3%
 58 Units - “Brazen” Orange Metallic - Paint Code 28U (USA 35/CAN 8/MEX 15) 4%
 58 Units - “Sly” Steel Gray - Paint Code 75U (USA 50/CAN 8/MEX 0) 4%
 77 Units - “Pure” White - Paint Code 50U (USA 63 inc. 1 Heritage Ed. /CAN 2/MEX 12) 6%
 148 Units - “Aggressive” Red - Paint Code 74U (USA 126/CAN 8/MEX 14) 12%
 213 Units - “Cool” Silver - Paint Code 67U (USA 154/CAN 16/MEX 43) 17%
 221 Units - “Wicked” Ruby Red Metallic - Paint Code 79U (USA 195/CAN 10/MEX 16) 18%
 388 Units - “Mysterious” Black - Paint Code 41U (USA 345/CAN 28/MEX 15) 31%

2010 production
Starting in April 2009 the Wilmington, DE. plant was business as usual and pre-production builds began for the 2010 model year. Between April 21, 2009 and May 28, 2009 thirty 2010 model year VIN-coded cars were built on the Kappa platform. Of those, were 12 Pontiac Solstice Coupes and 8 Pontiac Solstice roadsters. Of the other remaining, 8 were Saturn SKYs and 2 were Opel GTs. They were then used as GM company vehicles to be evaluated and also as special event display vehicles. These vehicles were built to the 2010 model year specs with 2010 model year changes and had legal 2010 VIN numbers. Following the end of use term within the GM fleet, the vehicles were sent to auction. After these 30 2010 models, more 2009-spec Solstices were produced and were the last ones made at the plant.

2010 changes

Deletions
-(QFX) P245/45R18 all-season, blackwall tires 
-Exterior color (22U) Fresh (Hydro Blue Metallic) 
-Exterior color (28U) Brazen (Inferno Orange Metallic) 
-Exterior color (38U) Envious (Emerald Green Metallic) 
-Exterior color (48U) Deep (Blue) 
-Exterior color (75U) Sly (Dark Steel Gray Metallic)

New features
-Exterior color (GHF) Hypnotic (Ocean Blue Metallic)( premium paint) 
-Exterior color (GGW) Sly (Storm Gray Metallic) 
-(QKR) P245/45R18-96V performance, all-season radial tires (standard on 2MB67 Convertible and 2MB07 Coupe) 
-(BAY), (B4N), (BAZ) and (BIG) Heritage Editions
-(BTV) Remote vehicle start (Included and only available with (MX0) 5-speed automatic transmission)
-(20T) Blue Top (Included and only available with Heritage Edition Convertibles )

Changes
-(AU0) Remote Keyless Entry, with 2 transmitters, panic button and content theft alarm, RPO Code has changed to "(ATG)"

Heritage Edition
Heritage Edition, includes Blue or White Rally Stripe, Blue accent stitching on seats, steering wheel and shift knob (manual transmission only), (Q9Y) 18-inch polished aluminum split-spoke wheels, interior trim (192) Ebony leather seating surfaces and (20T) Blue cloth convertible top (Convertible). Only available with exterior colors (50U) Pure (Summit White) with Blue Rally Stripe or (GHF) Hypnotic (Ocean Blue Metallic) with White Rally Stripe.

2010 Solstices produced
 Solstice GXP Coupe, Kinetic Blue (Hypnotic) Black Leather LNF Manual Polished Air Heritage Ed.
 Solstice GXP Coupe, White (Pure) Black Leather LNF Auto Polished Air Heritage Ed.
 Solstice GXP Coupe, Red (Aggressive) Black Cloth LNF Auto Polished Air
 Solstice GXP Coupe, Dk Labyrinth Met (Sly) Black Leather LNF Manual Polished Air
 Solstice GXP Coupe, Dk Labyrinth Met (Sly) Red Leather LNF Auto Chrome Air
 Solstice GXP Coupe, Merlot Jewel (Wicked) Met Black Leather LNF Auto Chrome NO Air
 Solstice Coupe, Kinetic Blue (Hypnotic) Lt. Cashmere Leather LE5 Manual Polished Air
 Solstice Coupe, Red (Aggressive) Lt. Cashmere Leather LE5 Manual Polished Air
 Solstice GXP Coupe, Santiago Teal Met Black Leather LNF Auto Polished NO Air (Canadian Spec)
 Solstice GXP Coupe, Kinetic Blue (Hypnotic) Black Leather LNF Manual Chrome Air
 Solstice Coupe, Dk Labyrinth Met (Sly) Black Cloth LE5 Manual Polished Air
 Solstice GXP Coupe, Merlot Jewel Met (Wicked) Black Leather LNF Manual Polished Air
 Solstice, Pure White Black Leather Black LE5 Auto Polished Air Heritage Ed.
 Solstice GXP, Kinetic Blue Black Leather Black LNF Manual Polished Air Heritage Ed.
 Solstice GXP, Mysterious Black Black Leather Black LNF Manual Polished Air
 Solstice GXP, Dk Labyrinth Met Black Leather Black LNF Auto Chrome Air
 Solstice GXP, Kinetic Blue Black Leather Black LNF Manual Chrome Air
 Solstice, Dk Labyrinth Met Lt. Cashmere Leather Tan LE5 Auto Polished Air
 Solstice, Dk Labyrinth Met Black Leather Black LE5 Auto Polished Air
 Solstice GXP, Kinetic Blue Black Leather Black LNF Manual Chrome Air

Yearly American sales

Concept variations

Weekend Club Racer concept

Built by GM Performance Division, this special Solstice features a removable hardtop that drew inspiration from the Dodge Viper roadster, an aggressive body kit, and an oversized spoiler. Engine is rated . It includes 18-inch wheels with Goodyear Eagle F1 255/45ZR18 tires, cat-back performance exhaust system, T-2 race suspension package, along with larger diameter disc brakes.
The car was unveiled at the 2005 SEMA Show. This vehicle is featured as Jazz in the 2007 film Transformers.

GXP-R concept
It includes an SSBC Performance Brake Package and 19-inch x 8.5-inch wheels with Goodyear Eagle F1 245/40ZR19 tires.

The car was unveiled at the 2006 SEMA Show.

SD-290 race concept
The SD-290 race concept is a single-seat Solstice GXP with engine rated . Weight is reduced by installing driver-side only windscreen and elimination of door glass/hardware, convertible top/hardware, HVAC system and wiper system. It includes Solo Performance cat-back exhaust system, KW Automotive coil-over suspension package, 6-piston aluminum calipers with  rotors from Stainless Steel Brake Company, forged 19-inch wheels with Hoosier R6 racing tire, rear spoiler, Removable racing-style steering wheel, Racing seat with four-point safety harness, Chrome fire extinguisher, Pegasus center console gauge package, Driver's roll bar

The car was unveiled at the 2006 SEMA Show.

Solstice GXP Coupe concept

The Solstice GXP Coupe concept is based on the GXP coupe. It is equipped with a GM Performance Parts Stage 2 performance kit and a performance air intake kit, which boosts engine power to about 290 hp (216 kW). The car also includes a GM Performance Parts cat-back exhaust system and race-ready suspension kit, polished factory wheels. The first version of the Coupe Concept was a metallic orange.

The car was unveiled at the 2008 SEMA Show.

Motorsport
Ryan Tuerck used to drive a Mobil 1 Pontiac Solstice fielded by Gardella Racing. Ryan Tuerck won the 2008 Formula Drift Driver of the Year award and finished 2nd in points for the 2009 season. The Pontiac Solstice Tuerck drove has over 500 hp and built off the stock LSJ engine found in the 2004-2007 Saturn Ion Redline and 2005-2007 Chevy Cobalt SS.
 SCCA Club Racing 2006 National Championship Runoffs the Pontiac Solstice placed first place in Showroom Stock B (SSB).
 SCCA Club Racing 2007 National Championship Runoffs the Pontiac Solstice GXP placed 1st, 2nd, and 3rd place in Touring 2 (T2) and the Pontiac Solstice placed first place in Showroom Stock B (SSB) even after being penalized 200 lbs between the 2006 and 2007 seasons.
 SCCA Club Racing 2008 National Championship the Pontiac Solstice GXP placed 1st, 2nd, and 3rd place in Touring 2 (T2)
 SCCA Club Racing 2009 National Championship the Pontiac Solstice GXP placed 1st and 3rd place in Touring 2 (T2)

Shared technology
The sharing of technology and various components is a common practice among automakers, resulting in reduced parts costs. The Solstice shares major components with nearly every GM division:
 The rear axle and differential are from the Sigma-based Cadillac CTS
 The interior storage bin is from the Cadillac XLR
 The passenger side front airbag, steering column, and exterior and interior door handles are from the Chevrolet Cobalt
 The backup lights are from the GMC Envoy
 The heating, ventilating, and air conditioning modules are from the Hummer H3
 The front fog lamp assembly is from the Pontiac Grand Prix
 The steering wheel is also featured in the Pontiac G5, Chevrolet Corvette, Chevrolet Cobalt
 The 2.4 L Ecotec engine is shared with the Pontiac G6, Chevrolet Cobalt, Chevrolet Malibu, and Chevrolet HHR
 The five-speed manual transmission is the same as in the Hummer H3, GMC Canyon, and Chevrolet Colorado
 The five-speed automatic is identical to those of the Cadillac CTS, STS, and SRX
 The seat frames are from the previous generation Opel Corsa

Discontinuation
In April 2009, after GM announced the discontinuation of the Pontiac brand by the end of 2010, CEO Fritz Henderson stated that the Solstice would not continue under another GM brand.  Although they considered selling the Wilmington plant and the Solstice/Sky products to an outside business, the Wilmington assembly plant closed in July 2009.  In October 2009, the new DeLorean Motor Company expressed interest in continuing production of the Solstice, going so far as to release concept artwork for a 2011 DeLorean Solstice. These plans were shelved shortly thereafter, when Fisker Automotive instead acquired the Wilmington Assembly where the Solstice was produced.

Reviews
AutoWeek.com (2004). Drive of pre production Solstices. Our first drive in Pontiac's new drop-top leaves us longing for more
MotorTrend.com (2004). We asked for it and we got it: a good-handling Solstice 
MPH Magazine (Oct. 2005). drives the Solstice in the Land of the Midnight Sun.
Automobile Magazine (Oct. 2005). Long before his roadster dream began, Lutz worked at BMW 
Road and Track Magazine (Oct. 2005). When it was introduced as a concept car at the January 2002 Detroit auto show...
Car and Driver Magazine (Oct. 2005). We were worried in a big way, worried that the Pontiac Solstice would turn out to be a cost-cut, watered-down...
Motor Trend Magazine (Oct. 2005). Move Over, Sunshine: This is no Fiero; this is the Pontiac of sports cars 
Autoweek Magazine (August 29, 2005). What a Concept: Solstice gives Pontiac—and GM—a much needed shot in the arm
New York Times (July 2, 2009). Behind the Wheel: 2009 Pontiac Solstice Coupe - The Last Pontiac

References

20. The Pontiac Solstice Book. Author Gary Witzenburg. Publisher Lamm-Morada Publishing Co. Inc., Publishing Date 2006.

External links

 Official Pontiac Solstice site

Solstice
Roadsters
Hardtop convertibles
Rear-wheel-drive vehicles
Motor vehicles manufactured in the United States
Cars introduced in 2004